In mathematical physics, the causal structure of a Lorentzian manifold describes the causal relationships between points in the manifold.

Introduction 
In modern physics (especially general relativity) spacetime is represented by a Lorentzian manifold. The causal relations between points in the manifold are interpreted as describing which events in spacetime can influence which other events.

The causal structure of an arbitrary (possibly curved) Lorentzian manifold is made more complicated by the presence of curvature. Discussions of the causal structure for such manifolds must be phrased in terms of smooth curves joining pairs of points. Conditions on the tangent vectors of the curves then define the causal relationships.

Tangent vectors 

If  is a Lorentzian manifold (for metric  on manifold ) then the nonzero tangent vectors at each point in the manifold can be classified into three disjoint types.
A tangent vector  is:
 timelike if 
 null or lightlike if 
 spacelike if 
Here we use the  metric signature. We say that a tangent vector is non-spacelike if it is null or timelike.

The names for the tangent vectors come from the physics of this model. The causal relationships between points in Minkowski spacetime take a particularly simple form because the tangent space is also  and hence the tangent vectors may be identified with points in the space. The classification of any vector in the space will be the same in all frames of reference that are related by a Lorentz transformation (but not by a general Poincaré transformation because the origin may then be displaced) because of the invariance of the metric.

Time-orientability 
At each point in  the timelike tangent vectors in the point's tangent space can be divided into two classes. To do this we first define an equivalence relation on pairs of timelike tangent vectors.

There are then two equivalence classes which between them contain all timelike tangent vectors at the point.
We can (arbitrarily) call one of these equivalence classes future-directed and call the other past-directed. Physically this designation of the two classes of future- and past-directed timelike vectors corresponds to a choice of an arrow of time at the point. The future- and past-directed designations can be extended to null vectors at a point by continuity.

A Lorentzian manifold is time-orientable if a continuous designation of future-directed and past-directed for non-spacelike vectors can be made over the entire manifold.

Curves 
A smooth path has  differentiable an appropriate number of times (typically ), and a regular path has nonvanishing derivative.

When  is time-orientable, the curve is oriented if the parameter change is required to be monotonic.

Smooth regular curves (or paths) in  can be classified depending on their tangent vectors. Such a curve is
 chronological (or timelike) if the tangent vector is timelike at all points in the curve. Also called a world line.
 null if the tangent vector is null at all points in the curve.
 spacelike if the tangent vector is spacelike at all points in the curve.
 causal (or non-spacelike) if the tangent vector is timelike or null at all points in the curve.
The requirements of regularity and nondegeneracy of  ensure that closed causal curves (such as those consisting of a single point) are not automatically admitted by all spacetimes.

If the manifold is time-orientable then the non-spacelike curves can further be classified depending on their orientation with respect to time.

 future-directed if, for every point in the curve, the tangent vector is future-directed.
 past-directed if, for every point in the curve, the tangent vector is past-directed.
These definitions only apply to causal (chronological or null) curves because only timelike or null tangent vectors can be assigned an orientation with respect to time.

 A closed timelike curve is a closed curve which is everywhere future-directed timelike (or everywhere past-directed timelike).
 A closed null curve is a closed curve which is everywhere future-directed null (or everywhere past-directed null).
 The holonomy of the ratio of the rate of change of the affine parameter around a closed null geodesic is the redshift factor.

Causal relations 

These relations satisfy the following properties:
	
  implies  (this follows trivially from the definition)
 ,  implies 
 ,  implies 
 ,  are reflexive

For a point  in the manifold  we define

We similarly define

 elsewhere as points not in the light cone, causal future, or causal past.

These sets 

For  a subset of  we define

For  two subsets of  we define

See Hawking and Ellis.
See Hawking and Ellis.
 A future set is a set closed under chronological future.
 A past set is a set closed under chronological past.
 An indecomposable past set (IP) is a past set which isn't the union of two different open past proper subsets.
 A proper indecomposable past set (PIP) is an IP which isn't a TIP.  is a proper indecomposable past set (PIP).
Similarly for the past Cauchy development. The Cauchy development is the union of the future and past Cauchy developments. Cauchy developments are important for the study of determinism.

 A metric is globally hyperbolic if it can be foliated by Cauchy surfaces.
 The chronology violating set is the set of points through which closed timelike curves pass.
 The causality violating set is the set of points through which closed causal curves pass.
 The boundary of the causality violating set is a Cauchy horizon. If the Cauchy horizon is generated by closed null geodesics, then there's a redshift factor associated with each of them.

Properties 
See Penrose (1972), p13.

 
 
 
 
 The horismos is generated by null geodesic congruences.

Topological properties:
  is open for all subsets .
  for all subsets . Here  is the closure of a subset .

Conformal geometry 

(See conformal map).

As an example suppose  is a timelike tangent vector with respect to the  metric. This means that . We then have that  so  is a timelike tangent vector with respect to the  too.

It follows from this that the causal structure of a Lorentzian manifold is unaffected by a conformal transformation.

A null geodesic remains a null geodesic under a conformal rescaling.

Conformal infinity 

An infinite metric admits geodesics of infinite length/proper time. However, we can sometimes make a conformal rescaling of the metric with a conformal factor which falls off sufficiently fast to 0 as we approach infinity to get the conformal boundary of the manifold. The topological structure of the conformal boundary depends upon the causal structure.

 Future-directed null geodesics end up on ℐ+, the future null infinity.
 Past-directed null geodesics end up on ℐ−, the past null infinity.
 Spacelike geodesics end up on spacelike infinity.
 For Minkowski space,  are points, ℐ± are null sheets, and spacelike infinity has codimension 2.
 For anti-de Sitter space, there's no timelike or null infinity, and spacelike infinity has codimension 1.
 For de Sitter space, the future and past timelike infinity has codimension 1.

Gravitational singularity 

If a geodesic terminates after a finite affine parameter, and it is not possible to extend the manifold to extend the geodesic, then we have a singularity.
 For black holes, the future timelike boundary ends on a singularity in some places.
 For the Big Bang, the past timelike boundary is also a singularity.

The absolute event horizon is the past null cone of the future timelike infinity. It is generated by null geodesics which obey the Raychaudhuri optical equation.

See also 

 Causal dynamical triangulation (CDT)
 Causality conditions 
 Causal sets
 Cauchy surface
 Closed timelike curve
 Cosmic censorship hypothesis
 Globally hyperbolic manifold
 Malament–Hogarth spacetime
 Penrose diagram
 Penrose–Hawking singularity theorems
 Spacetime

Notes

References

Further reading

G. W. Gibbons, S. N. Solodukhin; The Geometry of Small Causal Diamonds arXiv:hep-th/0703098 (Causal intervals)
S.W. Hawking, A.R. King, P.J. McCarthy; A new topology for curved space–time which incorporates the causal, differential, and conformal structures; J. Math. Phys. 17 2:174-181 (1976);  (Geometry, Causal Structure)
A.V. Levichev; Prescribing the conformal geometry of a lorentz manifold by means of its causal structure; Soviet Math. Dokl. 35:452-455, (1987); (Geometry, Causal Structure)
D. Malament; The class of continuous timelike curves determines the topology of spacetime; J. Math. Phys. 18 7:1399-1404 (1977);  (Geometry, Causal Structure)
A.A. Robb ; A theory of time and space; Cambridge University Press, 1914; (Geometry, Causal Structure)
A.A. Robb ; The absolute relations of time and space; Cambridge University Press, 1921; (Geometry, Causal Structure)
A.A. Robb ; Geometry of Time and Space; Cambridge University Press, 1936; (Geometry, Causal Structure)
R.D. Sorkin, E. Woolgar; A Causal Order for Spacetimes with C^0 Lorentzian Metrics: Proof of Compactness of the Space of Causal Curves; Classical & Quantum Gravity 13: 1971-1994 (1996); arXiv:gr-qc/9508018 (Causal Structure)

External links 
  Turing Machine Causal Networks by Enrique Zeleny, the Wolfram Demonstrations Project
 

Lorentzian manifolds
Theory of relativity
General relativity
Theoretical physics